Mark Anthony Breland (born May 11, 1963) is an American former professional boxer who competed from 1984 to 1997, and held the WBA welterweight title twice between 1987 and 1990. He later became an actor with a wide range of movie and television credits, having made his debut in The Lords of Discipline, and also appeared in the music video for The Pointer Sisters' 1985 hit single, "Dare Me."

Amateur career
Breland, who was born in Brooklyn, New York, began fighting when he was 9 years old, taking on challengers in the lobby and hallways of the housing project which happened to be his home. At 13, he entered the gym and embraced boxing as a way of life. He won five New York Golden Gloves titles, surpassing Sugar Ray Robinson for the most wins in the history of the Golden Gloves. Breland is notably the only amateur boxer to have ever graced the cover of Ring magazine, and the only amateur whose picture hangs in Colorado Springs U.S. Olympic Training Center. The Smithsonian Museum for African American History and Culture in Washington, DC displays an honorary picture of Mark Breland in recognition of his achievements.

Mark Breland won a gold medal at the 1984 Olympics, was awarded the 1982 Boxer of the Year by USAABF, and rated #1 amateur welterweight in the world by AIBA in 1984.

Breland was so exceptional, that he had been having trouble getting sparring partners in the Bedford-Stuyvesant Boxing Association Gym. In June 1984, when he was preparing himself for the forthcoming National Olympic Trials, he went to Grossinger, New York, to train with the Kronks, there he sparred with Thomas Hearns, who in turn was preparing to fight Roberto Durán. At that time Breland was being trained by Emanuel Steward. At that time he narrowly escaped bigger troubles, falling under destructive influence of his teammate Ricky Womack, who happened to be an authoritative figure for Breland, eventually was sentenced and jailed.

Highlights

 Won the 39th Intercity Golden Gloves in the welterweight division, Madison Square Garden, New York City, April 1981:
Defeated Efrain Bennett KO 1
Participated in the United States National Championships, in Concord, California, May 1981:
1/4: Lost to Darryl Anthony by split decision, 2–3 
 Won the U.S. National Sports Festival (Welterweight) in Syracuse, New York, July 1981:
1/2: Defeated Roman George RSC 3
Finals: Defeated Darryl Robinson RSC 1
 United States Welterweight Champion, Charlotte, North Carolina, April 1982:
1/4: Defeated Ron Essett RSC 1
1/2: Defeated Frank Warren by unanimous decision, 5–0
Finals: Defeated Louis Howard RSCH 2 
Made the U.S. National Team at the World Champ Box-Offs in Colorado Springs, Colorado, April 1982:
Defeated Louis Howard
 at the World Championships (Welterweight) in Munich, West Germany, May 1982:
1/16: Defeated Vesa Koskela (Sweden) RET 2
1/8: Defeated Mihai Ciubotaru (Romania) KO 1
1/4: Defeated Jenő Danyi (Hungary) by unanimous decision, 5–0
1/2: Defeated Manfred Zielonka (West Germany) by unanimous decision, 5–0
Finals: Defeated Serik Konakbayev (Soviet Union) by unanimous decision, 5–0
Won the USA–Poland Duals (Welterweight) in Caesars Palace, Las Vegas, Nevada, October 1982:
Defeated Stanisław Marczyński (Poland) by unanimous decision, 3–0
Withdrew from the United States National Championships, in Indianapolis, Indiana, December 1982:
1/16: Lost to Kurt Whitesell by medical walkover

Won the AIBA International Challenge (Welterweight) in Korakuen Hall, Tokyo, Japan, May 1983:
Defeated Yong Beom Chung (South Korea) by unanimous decision, 5–0
 United States Welterweight Champion, Colorado Springs, Colorado, November 1983:
1/16: Defeated Bill Harrington RSC 3
1/8: Defeated Tony Golden RSC 2
1/4: Defeated Larry Gentile by decision
1/2: Defeated Alton Rice by unanimous decision, 5–0
Finals: Defeated James Mitchell RSC 2 
Won the AIBA International Challenge (Welterweight) in Los Angeles, California, April 1984:
Defeated Luciano Bruno (Italy) by decision
Qualified as a Welterweight at the National Olympic Trials in Fort Worth, Texas, June 1984:
1/4: Defeated Mylon Watkins KO 1
1/2: Defeated Louis Howard by unanimous decision, 5–0
Finals: Defeated Davey Gutierrez by unanimous decision, 5–0
Made the U.S. National Team at the Olympic Box-Offs in Las Vegas, Nevada, July 1984:
Defeated Louis Howard by unanimous decision, 5–0
 at the 1984 Summer Olympics (Welterweight) in Los Angeles, California, July–August 1984:
1/32: Defeated Wayne Gordon (Canada) by unanimous decision, 5–0
1/16: Defeated Carlos Reyes (Puerto Rico) RSC 3
1/8: Defeated Rudel Obreja (Romania) by unanimous decision, 5–0
1/4: Defeated Genaro Leon (Mexico) KO 1
1/2: Defeated Luciano Bruno (Italy) by unanimous decision, 5–0
Finals: Defeated Yong-Su Ahn (South Korea) by unanimous decision, 5–0

Already in 1981, age 18, professional boxing promoters and managers have offered him huge sums up to $300,000 to sign a professional contract. But Breland has turned down these offers, partly by anticipating the 1984 Olympics, and in part because due to the promoters' neglect: "It's not 'cause I need the money. It's 'cause they need the money. Hey, I can get hurt." Planning his professional career, he planned to leave the ring before he's 30.

Breland compiled an impressive amateur record of 110–1 (with 73 knockouts, plus one unaccounted loss by medical disqualification, due to withdrawal because of toxic poisioning, spent most of the week in a New York hospital.)

Professional career
Breland turned professional in 1984. In 1987, Breland won the vacant WBA welterweight title by defeating Harold Volbrecht by seventh round TKO. He lost it in his first defense to Marlon Starling. In 1989, Breland again won the vacant WBA Welterweight Title. He made three successful title defenses before losing it to Aaron Davis in a back-and-forth 9-round contest that was nearly called off twice because of injuries to Davis' eye before Breland was caught and knocked out in round 9.

In 1997, Breland retired with a professional record of 35–3–1 (25 KOs). His record blemishes were a draw with Marlon Starling and losses to Jorge Vaca, Aaron Davis and Marlon Starling.

Breland is currently a boxing trainer, having trained Vernon Forrest and former WBC Heavyweight champion Deontay Wilder among other notable boxers.

Professional boxing record

See also
List of world welterweight boxing champions

References

External links

|-

1963 births
Living people
American male boxers
Boxers from New York City
Sportspeople from Brooklyn
African-American boxers
Boxers at the 1984 Summer Olympics
Olympic boxers of the United States
Olympic gold medalists for the United States in boxing
Medalists at the 1984 Summer Olympics
Winners of the United States Championship for amateur boxers
AIBA World Boxing Championships medalists
Welterweight boxers
World welterweight boxing champions
World Boxing Association champions
American boxing trainers
21st-century African-American people
20th-century African-American sportspeople